Hamburg is a German surname. Notable people with the surname include:

 Charlie Hamburg (1863–1931), baseball player
 Daniel Hamburg (born 1948), American politician
 Joan Hamburg (born 1935), American radio personality
 Julia Hamburg (born 1986), German politician
 Margaret Hamburg (born 1955), American physician
 Roger van Hamburg (born 1954), Dutch swimmer

See also 

 Hamberg (surname)

German-language surnames